Castore e Polluce (Castor and Pollux) is an opera seria by Francesco Bianchi. The libretto was one translated by Carlo Innocenzo Frugoni, from Pierre-Joseph Bernard's French text for Rameau's Castor et Pollux.

The opera was extravagantly in the French style. As Marita P. McClymonds explains, "Castore contains all the elements that had been purged from Italian serious opera before the turn of the century: gods appearing in machines, miraculous scene changes, arias without exit, much use of chorus, and an infernal scene in the underworld with dancing."

Performance history
The opera was first performed in four acts at the Teatro della Pergola in Florence on 10 January 1779. It was revised for a three-act version for the same theatre on 8 September 1779.

Roles

Synopsis
The immortal Polluce wishes to change places with his mortal (and dead) brother, Castore, so that the latter can rejoin his lover Telaira. This causes many complications, not least with Telaira's sister (and Polluce's lover) Febe. Giove ultimately reunites Polluce, Castore and Telaira in heaven.

References

Opera seria
Operas by Francesco Bianchi
1779 operas
Italian-language operas
Operas
Operas based on classical mythology